Drumahaire is a barony in County Leitrim, Republic of Ireland.

Etymology
Drumahaire barony takes its name from the village of Dromahair ("Two Demons Ridge"). The Irish thiar is a shortening of eithiar, a term that refers to a spirit of the air.

Location

Drumahaire is found in central County Leitrim, stretching from the Dartry Mountains and Lough Gill to the Iron Mountains and Lough Allen.

The Barony of Drumahaire is bordered to the north by Rosclogher; to the southeast by Leitrim and Carrigallen (all the preceding baronies are also in County Leitrim); to the east by Tullyhaw, County Cavan; to the west by Carbury and Tirerril, County Sligo; and to the south by Boyle, County Roscommon.

History
The Ó Ruairc (O'Rourke) were kings in this region for many centuries. O'Finn and O'Carroll were chiefs of Cálraighe, which included the civil parishes of Drumlease and Killargy. The MacKenny's (Keaney) were chiefs in an area known as Muinter Mountains, or Muintir-Kenny, an older name for the barony of Dromohair. Originally known as the Mac Consnamha, the Clan Kenny was said to originate in the parish of Innismagrath. They later were known as Mac Kinnawe and still later changed to Ford. The Mac Cagadháin (MacEgan?) were chief of Clan Fear a Muige here.

List of settlements

Below is a list of settlements in Drumahaire barony:
Dromahair
Drumkeeran
Manorhamilton

References

Baronies of County Leitrim